The Asus EeeBook is a lineup of affordable Windows laptops by Asus. In 2014, Asus introduced EeeBook lineup of computers starting with the X205TA model. By 2017 the EeeBook lineup was succeeded by the Asus VivoBook E Series. Some EeeBook laptops were rebranded to VivoBook E Series laptops such as the EeeBook E202 was rebranded to the VivoBook E202 and the EeeBook E402 to the VivoBook E402. The EeeBook lineup consists of the E202 (E202SA), E402 (E402MA), E502 (E502SA and E502MA) and X205 (X205TA)

Comparison of Specifications of EeeBook laptops

References 

Asus products